Judge Glenn may refer to:

Elias Glenn (1769–1846), judge of the United States District Court for the District of Maryland
John Lyles Glenn Jr. (1892–1938), judge of the United States District Courts for the Eastern and Western Districts of South Carolina
John Glenn (judge) (1795–1853), judge of the United States District Court for the District of Maryland